Infanta Mafalda of Portugal (also known as Blessed Mafalda, O.Cist. (c. 1195 – 1 May 1256 in Rio Tinto, Gondomar) was a Portuguese infanta (princess), later Queen consort of Castile for a brief period. She was the second youngest daughter of King Sancho I of Portugal and Dulce of Aragon. Married briefly to the ten-year-old Henry I of Castile, she held for a time the title Queen of Castile.

Upon the dissolution of the marriage, Mafalda returned to her homeland. She chose to become a Cistercian nun, and became noted for the holiness of her life. She was declared Blessed by the Catholic Church five centuries after her death.

Life

Early life
Mafalda of Portugal was born around 1195, the daughter of King Sancho I of Portugal and his queen, Dulce of Aragon.

On the death of her father, Mafalda, under the provisions of his will, was to receive the Seia Castle and the remaining portion of the municipality as well as all income produced there. Furthermore, she was granted the right to use the title of queen. This created a conflict with her brother Afonso II O Gordo, who, wanting a centralized power, hindered his sister from receiving the titles and the corresponding rights. Afonso feared that something similar could happen with his two sisters, Teresa and Sancha, and their eventual heirs, creating a problem of sovereignty that could come to divide the country. Much of the Portuguese nobles sided with Mafalda and her sisters, but they were defeated. On the death of Afonso II, his son Sancho II granted some lands and castles to his aunts but he made them renounce the title of princess-queen. The final peace came in 1223.

Marriage
In 1215, a political marriage was arranged between Mafalda and her young cousin Henry I of Castile. As he was about ten years old, the marriage was never consummated, and it was dissolved the following year on grounds of consanguinity. She then returned to Portugal.

Monastic life
In 1220, Mafalda chose not to marry again and became a nun at the Abbey of Arouca, though she was granted a special dispensation to retain control of her inheritance. She became abbess of the community, then one of Benedictine nuns, and in 1226 had her request to transfer the abbey to the Cistercian Order granted by the pope. She had a great devotion to Our Lady of Silva and made substantial donations to the shrine. She also had a hospice for travelers built as well as a number of bridges, churches, monasteries, and hospitals. She helped to establish her own abbey as a major religious center in the region for centuries.

Returning from a pilgrimage to the shrine of Our Lady of Silva, she fell ill at Rio Tinto, Gondomar, and died at the monastery of Cistercians monks there on 1 May 1256. In 1616, wanting to return her body to Arouca as part of the process of her possible canonization, it was found not to have deteriorated, which generated a strong devotion to the Portuguese princess. She was beatified in 1792 by Pope Pius VI. Her feast day is celebrated on June 20, together with her two sisters.

Ancestry

References

|-

1190s births
1256 deaths
House of Burgundy-Portugal
Portuguese infantas
Castilian queen consorts
13th-century Portuguese nuns
Female saints of medieval Portugal
Cistercian abbesses
Cistercian beatified people
Roman Catholic royal saints
13th-century Christian saints
13th-century venerated Christians
Incorrupt saints
13th-century Spanish women
13th-century Castilians
Beatifications by Pope Pius VI
Daughters of kings